The 2017 Johan Cruyff Shield was the 22nd edition of the Johan Cruyff Shield, an annual Dutch football match played between the winners of the previous season's Eredivisie and KNVB Cup. The match was contested by Feyenoord, champions of the 2016–17 Eredivisie, and Vitesse, winners of the 2016–17 KNVB Cup. It was held at the De Kuip in Rotterdam on 5 August 2017. 

Feyenoord won the match 4–2 on penalties, following a 1–1 draw at the end of regulation. It was the first time that the Johan Cruyff Shield was decided by a penalty shoot-out.

For the first time, the Johan Cruyff Shield was played at the stadium of the previous season's Eredivisie winner, instead of the default Amsterdam Arena.

Match

References

 

2017
2017–18 in Dutch football
J
J
August 2017 sports events in Europe
Johan Cruyff Shield 2017